Carlos Eduardo Honorato (born November 9, 1974 in São Paulo) is a judoka from Brazil, who won the silver medal in the middleweight (– 90 kg) division at the 2000 Summer Olympics in Sydney, Australia. In the final he was defeated by Holland's Mark Huizinga.

References

External links
 
 
 Profile 

1974 births
Living people
Judoka at the 2000 Summer Olympics
Judoka at the 2004 Summer Olympics
Olympic judoka of Brazil
Olympic silver medalists for Brazil
Judoka at the 2003 Pan American Games
Sportspeople from São Paulo
Olympic medalists in judo
Brazilian male judoka
Medalists at the 2000 Summer Olympics
Pan American Games bronze medalists for Brazil
Pan American Games medalists in judo
Medalists at the 2003 Pan American Games
20th-century Brazilian people
21st-century Brazilian people